Port Jefferson is the terminus for the Port Jefferson Branch of the Long Island Rail Road. The station is located on New York State Route 25A (Main Street), on the north side of the tracks, but is also accessible from Oakland Avenue (both of which are in the Village of Port Jefferson), as well as Railroad Avenue and Union Street on the south side of the tracks in Port Jefferson Station. All service is diesel-only, and most off-peak trains are shuttles requiring a transfer to an electric train at Huntington or Hicksville. 

The station also serves Suffolk County Transit buses and occasionally the Village of Port Jefferson's own local jitney buses. One Suffolk County Transit bus, (Route S61) leads to the Bridgeport & Port Jefferson Ferry, approximately one mile to the north. It features service to Bridgeport, Connecticut, hence the reason for some station name signs being adjacent to "Bridgeport Ferries" signs.

History
Port Jefferson station was originally opened on January 13, 1873 by the Smithtown and Port Jefferson Railroad, but was burned on February 1, 1874. The second station was completed in June 1875. In 1895, the Port Jefferson Branch was extended to Wading River. The second Port Jefferson station was closed in 1903, and was used as a yard building, while the third station was built across Main Street. Designed by Stanford White and funded by the residents of the nearby Village of Belle Terre, it opened on July 29, 1903. Port Jefferson Station resumed its status as the terminus of the line on October 9, 1938, when the line was abandoned between Port Jefferson and Wading River. The "yard building" was abandoned in April 1963. The station was remodeled in 1968, but restored in 2001 based on its previous 1903 design.

In 2019, the LIRR completed an extensive renovation of the station building, restoring it to its prototypical appearance at the turn of the twentieth century. New signage and brick-paver walkways were also installed.

Station layout
This station has one 10-car-long high-level side platform north of the tracks. To the east of the station is the Port Jefferson Yard, which provides additional storage tracks.

Gallery

References

External links

Old Port Jefferson Station Photo (Newsday)
Bridgeport - Port Jefferson Ferry website
TrainsAreFun.com
LIRR 1948-51 Port Jefferson Branch Freight Recollections, by Peter Boylan (August 26, 2002)
Erie-Lackawanna boxcar @ Port Jefferson Station (1978)
Train #161 about to cross Main Street (August, 1979)
 JEFF Interlocking (The LIRR Today)
 Station from Main Street from Google Maps Street View

Long Island Rail Road stations in Suffolk County, New York
Railway stations in the United States opened in 1873
1873 establishments in New York (state)
Brookhaven, New York